Miami-Yoder School District 60JT is a school district headquartered in Rush, Colorado.

The district serves elementary, middle, and high school levels.  the district has 318 students in its Miami-Yoder School facility.

References

External links
 

School districts in Colorado
Education in El Paso County, Colorado